The episodes from the anime La Corda d'Oro are based on the manga of the same name written and illustrated by Yuki Kure, that is itself an adaptation of a video game with designs done by Kure. The series is produced by Ruby Party (a division of Koei), animated by Yumeta Company, and directed by Kōjin Ochi.  The story is about a high school girl, Kahoko, who is given a magic violin by a musical fairy and must take part in an elite music competition surrounded by attractive men, but at the same time it's about her love for the violin and none of the men.

The series is made of two seasons. The first, entitled La Corda d'Oro: Primo Passo, aired on Japanese television from October 2, 2006 to March 26, 2007. The 25 TV episode and one OVA were compiled into 9 DVD volumes. The second season has only two episodes, the first of which aired on March 26, 2009 and the second on June 5, 2009. Both seasons are available for streaming on Crunchyroll and the first has been licensed by Sentai Filmworks.

Two pieces of theme music were used for the first season of the anime; The opening theme was "Brand New Breeze", performed by Kanon, and the ending theme was "Crescendo", performed by Stella Quintet. The second season has only an ending theme: 蒼穹のスコア ～The score in blue～ by Stella Quintet.

~Primo Passo~

~Secondo Passo~

References

External links
La Corda d'Oro at TV Tokyo 
Official website 

Lists of anime episodes
Episodes